The Matsushita JR series was a line of microcomputers produced by Matsushita Electric Industrial (now Panasonic) during the 1980s. Based on the success of the Sharp MZ and NEC PC-8000 series, it was an attempt by Matsushita to enter the personal computer market.

The JR series included four computer models: the JR-100, the JR-200, the JR-300 and the JR-800.

JR-100
The JR-100 was released on November 21st, 1981 with a price of 54,800 yen. Like the Hitachi Basic Master and Sharp MZ-80, it was a low-performance, low-priced personal computer offering basic semi-graphic character based graphics, a monochrome display, and minimal sound ability. The CPU was an 8-bit Panasonic MN1800A NMOS microprocessor  (compatible with the Motorola MC6802, a slightly improved version of the Motorola MC6800) running at a slow 0.89 MHz, and it came with 16 KB of RAM (expandable to 32 KB).

Specifications:
CPU: MN1800A (MC6802 compatible)
Clock speed: 890 KHz
RAM: 16-32 KB
ROM: 8 KB
Graphics: Monochrome; 32x24 text characters; 64x48 semi-graphic characters with 8x8 pixel matrix
Sound: Internal speaker
Connections: Monitor, Expansion, Tape (Frequency-shift keying encoding with 1200Hz for space and 2400Hz for mark; 600 baud)
OS: JR-BASIC 1.0

JR-200

The JR-200 is made of silver grey plastic, and has a black matte area around the chiclet keyboard area.  It used the same MN1800A CPU as the previous model, but added a second processor, the 4-bit MN1544CJR, which is used for I/O and contains 128 bytes of RAM plus four kilobytes of ROM.

The computer received favorable reviews on its launch. Creative Computing wrote "The Panasonic JR-200 is one of the nicest new computers to make the scene in some time."

A version of the JR-200 called the Panasonic JR-200U was developed for the North American and European markets and was announced in January 1983.

Specifications:
CPU: MN1800A + MN1544
Clock speed: 890 KHz
RAM: 36 KB
ROM: 16 KB
Graphics: 8 colors (black, blue, red, magenta, green, cyan, yellow, white); 256x192; 32x24 text characters; 64x48 semi-graphic characters with 8x8 pixel matrix
Sound: 3 voices, 5 octaves, square wave. Generated by the MN1271 sound, I/O and timer chip.
Connections: Composite and RF video, expansion, tape (600/2400 bauds), printer port, floppy drive, joystick
OS: JR-BASIC 5.0

JR-300
The JR-300, released in 1984, was completely redesigned in comparison with the earlier JR-100 and JR-200 models. The JR-300 had a Zilog Z80A CPU as well as a second MN1800A CPU to allow backwards compatibility with the JR-200.

Specifications:
CPU: MN1800A + Z80A 
Clock speed: 4 MHz
RAM: 82 KB
ROM: 40 KB
Graphics: 8 colors; 640x200; 320x200; 640x400
Sound: Yamaha 8910 (3 voices, 5 octaves)
Connections: RGB, Composite and RF video, sound out, expansion, tape (600/2400 bauds), printer port, floppy drive, joystick
OS: JR-BASIC 5.0, Extended Basic

JR-800
A handheld model called JR-800 was launched in 1983 with a price of 128,000 yen, but it was not compatible with the previous JR computers.
It was based around a Hitachi HD63A01V CPU (MC6801 compatible) running at 4.9152 MHz, with 16 KB of RAM, and featured a 192x64 pixel LCD screen.

Specifications:
CPU: HD63A01V
Clock speed: 4.9152 MHz
RAM: 16 KB
ROM: 16 KB
Graphics: monochrome LCD, 32x8 characters; 192x64 pixels
Connections: tape, RS-232, printer, sound 
OS: BASIC

Character set
Semigraphics character set for the Matsushita JR series, as shown on the operations manual (JR-100U manual, pg.8). Characters are rendered using modern equivalents, the exact hardware font it not simulated.

See also
JR-BASIC
Panasonic JR-200
Sharp MZ
PC-8000 series

References

External links
 The Pocket Computer Museum entry on the National JR-800 handheld computer
 BINARIUM museum entry on the Panasonic JR-100 (German language)

Home computers
Panasonic computers
Character sets